The 2013 Sporting Kansas City season was the eighteenth season of the team's existence in Major League Soccer and the third year played under the Sporting Kansas City moniker.

Sporting Kansas City entered the season as the defending U.S. Open Cup champions and as back-to-back Eastern Conference Regular Season Champions. By winning the 2012 U.S. Open Cup, they were qualified for the 2013–14 CONCACAF Champions League for the first time in franchise history.

Ivy Funds became the club's kit sponsor, a first for the franchise.

Sporting Kansas City qualified for the MLS Cup Playoffs for the 12th time in the team's 18-year history and third straight season, moving into a three-way tie for fourth most MLS Cup Playoff appearances with the Chicago Fire and FC Dallas, trailing only the Colorado Rapids (13), New York Red Bulls (14), and Los Angeles Galaxy (15). The team defeated New England Revolution, Houston Dynamo and Real Salt Lake to win the 2013 MLS Cup.

Squad

First team roster

Player movement

In

Out

Loans

In

Out

Competitions

Match results

Preseason

Desert Friendlies

2013 Disney Pro Soccer Classic

Major League Soccer

League table

Eastern Conference standings

Regular season 
Kickoff times are in CDT (UTC-05) unless shown otherwise

MLS Cup Playoffs

Bracket

Results

Conference Semifinals

Sporting Kansas City won 4-3 on aggregate

Conference Finals

Sporting Kansas City won 2–1 on aggregate

MLS Cup

Result

CONCACAF Champions League (2013–14) 

Advanced to Championship Stage

U.S. Open Cup

References 

Sporting Kansas City seasons
Sporting Kansas City
Sporting Kansas City
Sporting Kansas City
MLS Cup champion seasons